John Alexander Morrison (January 31, 1814 – July 25, 1904) was a Democratic member of the U.S. House of Representatives from Pennsylvania.

John A. Morrison was born in Colerain Township, Lancaster County, Pennsylvania. He studied medicine and graduated from the Jefferson Medical College at Philadelphia, Pennsylvania, in 1837 and commenced practice in Cochranville, Pennsylvania.

Morrison was elected as a Democrat to the Thirty-second Congress. He was inspector and appraiser of imports of drugs at the port of Philadelphia from 1853 to 1861. He resumed the practice of medicine in Cochranville from 1861 to 1865. He also engaged in agricultural and mercantile pursuits and died in Cochranville in 1904. Interment in Fagg's Manor Presbyterian Church Cemetery in  Londonderry Township, Chester County, Pennsylvania.

Sources

The Political Graveyard

1814 births
1904 deaths
Physicians from Pennsylvania
American Presbyterians
Thomas Jefferson University alumni
Democratic Party members of the United States House of Representatives from Pennsylvania
19th-century American politicians